Prosetín is a municipality and village in Chrudim District in the Pardubice Region of the Czech Republic. It has about 800 inhabitants.

Administrative parts
Villages of Malinné and Mokrýšov are administrative parts of Prosetín.

Gallery

References

External links

Villages in Chrudim District